Lawton Park is a neighborhood in Seattle, Washington. It is on the north side of Magnolia.

References

Magnolia, Seattle